Procolophonoidea is an extinct superfamily of procolophonian parareptiles. Members were characteristically small, stocky, and lizard-like in appearance. Fossils have been found worldwide from many continents including Antarctica. The first members appeared during the Late Permian in the Karoo Basin of South Africa.

Taxonomy
Procolophonoidea includes the families Owenettidae and Procolophonidae. Sclerosaurus, which is placed within its own family Sclerosauridae, may be a member of the superfamily as well. In 1997, De Braga and Rieppel defined this same taxon (the oldest common ancestor of Procolophonidae and Owenettidae and all its descendants) using the name Procolophoniformes.

When the superfamily was constructed in 1956, it was thought to be within the anthracosaur suborder Diadectomorpha. Since then it has been placed within the suborder Procolophonia along with the pareiasaurs, a group of large herbivorous Permian parareptiles.  
 
     
Procolophonia
Procolophonoidea
Family Owenettidae
Species "Owenetta" kitchingorum
Genus Barasaurus
Genus Candelaria 
Genus Owenetta
Genus Ruhuhuaria
Genus Saurodektes
Family Procolophonidae
? Genus Gomphiosauridion
? Genus Kinelia
? Genus Spondylolestes
? Genus Xenodiphyodon
Genus Coletta
Genus Kitchingnathus
Genus Lasasaurus
Genus Phaanthosaurus
Genus Pintosaurus
Genus Sauropareion
Genus Tichvinskia 
Subfmily Leptopleuroninae
Subfmily Procolophoninae
Subfmily Theledectinae

References

External links
Introduction to Procolophonoidea University of California Museum of Paleontology (UCMP)
Procolophonoidea in the Paleobiology Database

Procolophonomorphs
Prehistoric reptiles of Europe
Prehistoric reptiles of Africa
Prehistoric reptiles of Asia
Prehistoric reptiles of North America
Prehistoric reptiles of South America
Lopingian first appearances
Rhaetian extinctions